Haag is a village about four kilometers from Hemau in the Upper Palatinate, in Bavaria, Germany. It belongs administratively to the town of Hemau, Regensburg (district).

Geography of Bavaria